The second Grand Prix of the Royal Automobile Club, commonly referred to as the 1927 British Grand Prix, was a Grand Prix motor race held at the Brooklands circuit on 1 October 1927. It was the fifth and final race of the 1927 AIACR World Manufacturers' Championship season. The race was won by French driver Robert Benoist. It was his fourth victory from the season's five races, a performance that put the seal on his Delage team's already-unassailable lead in the Championship.

A similar circuit was used as in the race the previous year, that is using the Finishing Straight, on which two sandbank chicanes were constructed. However, the footbridge across the Finishing Straight, which in 1926 had two supports on the track itself, had been rebuilt as a single-span, which enabled the full width of the straight to be used and allowed the layout of the chicane at the top of the Finishing Straight to be altered.  The race itself also started half-way around the circuit, on the Railway Straight, rather than from the 1926 start at the junction of the Finishing Straight and the Members' Banking, meaning that the race distance was actually 124 and a half laps.

Classification 

Note: Fastest lap wasn't recorded.

Notes
  - Maurice Harvey did not start as they broke an oil pump in practice.

References 

British Grand Prix
British Grand Prix
1927 in British motorsport
October 1927 sports events
1927 in English sport